The Lesko Stone is a distinctive rock formation in the forest near the city of Lesko in the Bieszczady Mountains in Poland. It is most likely a result of glacial movements in the area and the whole formation is believed to have been carried to the present site by a glacier. Its peculiar shape was further pronounced as the area was a small rock quarry in past centuries. Despite being an environmentally protected site it is often scaled by climbers and outdoor enthusiasts.

Folklore

The stone is an important aspect of local culture with a number of legends related to its shape and origin. The most popular of those is related to the 16th century church in Lesko which claims the stone is a remnant of a failed attempt by the devil to destroy Christianity in the area. A variation of this story links the stone to a number of monasteries in the area. Many more legends exist and some of them are told on plaques currently fixed to the stone.

Mentions in Culture

Because of its location on the main route through the Bieszczady Mountains the Lesko Stone is mentioned several times in literature. The stone's beauty was an inspiration for a poem specifically about it written by Aleksander Fredro and also appears in his other works. It was also written about by Oskar Kolberg, Stanisław Staszic, and Wincenty Pol among others.

Rock formations of Poland